Agnesa Búřilová, née Wlachovská, (born 4 January 1943) is a former pair skater who competed for Czechoslovakia.

Agnesa Wlachovská began skating in 1952. After switching from singles to pairs, she had some bad falls — one resulted in a concussion that forced her to repeat a school year. With partner Peter Bartosiewicz, she finished ninth at the 1964 Winter Olympics. She became a coach after retiring from competition, working with 1984 Olympic bronze medalist Jozef Sabovčík.

Though born in Rožňava, Búřilová has lived most of her life in Bratislava. She has two sons, Peter Búřil and hockey player Vladimír Búřil (born in 1969). She is the great-aunt of Canadian ice dancer Andrew Poje.

Results 
(with Bartosiewicz)

References 

Czechoslovak female pair skaters
Slovak female pair skaters
Olympic figure skaters of Czechoslovakia
Figure skaters at the 1964 Winter Olympics
Universiade medalists in figure skating
1943 births
Living people
People from Rožňava
Universiade silver medalists for Czechoslovakia
Competitors at the 1966 Winter Universiade